The 2013–14 Edmonton Oilers season was the 35th season for the National Hockey League (NHL) franchise that was established on June 22, 1979, and 42nd season overall, including play in the World Hockey Association.

Off-season
On June 8, 2013, the Oilers fired head coach Ralph Krueger. Dallas Eakins was introduced as the new head coach on June 10. In addition to the hiring of Eakins as head coach, the Oilers also appointed Keith Acton as their associate coach on June 28, in addition to their current coaching staff; Kelly Buchberger, Steve Smith and Frederic Chabot.

Standings

Schedule and results

Pre-season

Regular season

Player statistics
Final Stats
Skaters

Goaltenders

†Denotes player spent time with another team before joining the Oilers. Stats reflect time with the Oilers only.
‡Traded mid-season. Stats reflect time with the Oilers only.
Bold/italics denotes franchise record

Awards

Milestones

Transactions 
The Oilers have been involved in the following transactions during the 2013–14 season.

Trades

Free agents signed

Free agents lost

Claimed via waivers

Lost via waivers

Player signings

Draft picks

Edmonton Oilers' picks at the 2013 NHL Entry Draft, to be held in Newark, New Jersey on June 30, 2013.

Draft notes
 The Edmonton Oilers' second-round pick went to the Los Angeles Kings as the result of a trade on June 30, 2013, that sent a second and third-round pick in 2013 (57th and 88th overall) and Carolina's fourth-round pick in 2013 (96th overall) to Edmonton in exchange for this pick.
 The Anaheim Ducks' second-round pick went to the Edmonton Oilers as a result of a July 12, 2011, trade that sent Andrew Cogliano to the Ducks in exchange for this pick.
 The Los Angeles Kings' second-round pick went to the St. Louis Blues as the result of a trade on June 30, 2013, that sent Tampa Bay's fourth-round pick in 2013 (94th overall) and St. Louis' third and fourth-round picks in 2013 (83rd and 113th overall) to Edmonton in exchange for this pick. Edmonton previously acquired this pick as the result of a trade on June 30, 2013, that sent a second-round pick in 2013 (37th overall) to Los Angeles in exchange for a third-round pick in 2013 (88th overall), Carolina's fourth-round pick in 2013 (96th overall) and this pick.
 The Edmonton Oilers' third-round pick went to the Dallas Stars as the result of a January 14, 2013, trade that sent Mark Fistric to the Oilers in exchange for this pick.
 The St. Louis Blues' third-round pick went to the Edmonton Oilers as the result of a trade on June 30, 2013, that sent Los Angeles' second-round pick in 2013 (57th overall) to St. Louis in exchange for Tampa Bay's fourth-round pick in 2013 (94th overall), a fourth-round pick in 2013 (113th overall) and this pick.
 The Los Angeles Kings' third-round pick went to the Edmonton Oilers as the result of a trade on June 30, 2013, that sent a second-round pick in 2013 (37th overall) to Los Angeles in exchange for a second-round pick in 2013 (57th overall), Carolina's fourth-round pick in 2013 (96th overall) and this pick.
 The Tampa Bay Lightning's fourth-round pick went to the Edmonton Oilers (via St. Louis), the Blues traded the pick to Edmonton as the result of a trade on June 30, 2013, that sent Los Angeles' second-round pick in 2013 (57th overall) to St. Louis in exchange for a third and fourth-round pick in 2013 (83rd and 113th overall) and this pick.
 The Edmonton Oilers' fourth-round pick went to the Florida Panthers as the result of an April 3, 2013, trade that sent Jerred Smithson to the Oilers in exchange for this pick.
 The St. Louis Blues' fourth-round pick went to the Edmonton Oilers as the result of a trade on June 30, 2013, that sent Los Angeles' second-round pick in 2013 (57th overall) to St. Louis in exchange for a third-round pick in 2013 (83rd overall), Tampa Bay's fourth-round pick in 2013 (94th overall) and this pick.

References

Edmonton Oilers seasons
Edmonton Oilers season, 2013-14
Edmon